is a Japanese voice actress from Tochigi Prefecture, Japan.

Voice roles

Anime

TV
1997
Cojicoji (Harehare)
1998
Fushigi Mahou Fun Fun Pharmacy (Pinchy)
Kocchi Muite! Miiko (Miiko Yamada)
1999
Ojamajo Doremi series (Misaki Shibayama, various others)
Digimon Adventure (Koushiro Izumi) aka izzy
Magic User's Club (Michiko Mikote, Rie)
Hunter × Hunter (Ponzu, Zushi, Kortopi)
2000
Digimon Adventure 02 (Koushiro Izumi)
2002
Digimon Frontier (Pandamon)
Full Moon o Sagashite (Sora)
2004
Battle B-Daman (Jinbee)
2005
Mahoraba Heartful Days (Asami Kurosaki)
2006
Digimon Savers (Pandamon)
2010
Digimon Xros Wars (Pandamon)

OVA
2002
Hunter × Hunter OVA (Kortopi)

Movie
2000
Digimon Adventure (Koushiro Izumi)
2001
Digimon Adventure 02 (Koushiro Izumi)

Video games
Summon Night (Akane)
Digimon World (Main Character)

External links
Umi Tenjin at Ryu's Seiyuu Info

Living people
Japanese video game actresses
Japanese voice actresses
Voice actresses from Tochigi Prefecture
Year of birth missing (living people)